Michael Thomas Gallagher, OAM (born 14 December 1978) is an Australian Paralympic cyclist from Scotland. He has won gold medals at the Beijing and 2012 London Paralympics. He was selected in the Australian team for the 2016 Rio Paralympics.  The Australian Sports Anti-Doping Agency (ASADA) revealed that Gallagher had returned a positive A sample for erythropoietin (EPO) in an out-of-competition training camp in Italy in July 2016.  This A positive disqualified him from the Rio Paralympics.

Personal
Gallagher was born on 14 December 1978 in Scotland and moved to Australia as a five-year-old. He has Erb's palsy in his right shoulder, due to an accident at birth. He lives in Melbourne and runs a construction business.

Cycling
Gallagher is a C5 classified track and road cyclist.  He started cycling with a family friend when he was twenty-five years old, and then started taking the sport more seriously. He cycles for Carnegie Caulfield Cycling Club, is affiliated with the Victorian Institute of Sport and is coached by Hilton Clarke Senior.  He first represented Australia in 2005 at the IPC European Championships. His cycling is sponsored by Victorian Institute of Sport (VIS), Bianchi, 2XU and CSM Cycles.

He was part of the Australian team at the 2005 IPC European Championships, the 2006 and 2007 Para-cycling World Championships, and the 2009, 2011 and 2012 Para-cycling Track World Championships. I He has also participated in road-racing competitions, including the 2009 Para-cycling Road World Championships and the 2011 Para-cycling Road World Cup in Australia.

At the 2008 Beijing Games, he won a gold medal in the Men's Individual Pursuit LC1 event, for which he received a Medal of the Order of Australia, and a bronze medal in the Men's Individual Road Race LC1–2/CP4 event.  At the 2012 London Paralympics, he participated in the Men's Road Race C4–5, Men's Time Trial C5, Men's Individual Pursuit C5 and the Mixed Team Sprint C1–5 events – winning a gold medal in the Individual Pursuit C5 and a bronze medal in the Time Trial C5.

Competing at the 2013 UCI Para-cycling Road World Championships in Baie-Comeau, Canada, he won a gold medal in the Men's Road Race C5. At the 2014 UCI Para-cycling Track World Championships in Aguascalientes, Mexico, he won the gold medal in the Men's 4 km Individual Pursuit C4. He broke the world record with a time of 4minutes and 24.057 seconds in the qualifying.

At the 2015 UCI Para-cycling Track World Championships in Appledorn, Netherlands, he won the gold medal in the Men's 4 km Individual Pursuit C5 and a bronze medal in the 15 km Scratch Race C5.

Competing at the 2015 UCI Para-cycling Road World Championships in Nottwil, Switzerland, he finished tenth in the Men's Time Trial C5 and fifth in the Men's Road Race C5.

At the 2016 UCI Para-cycling Track World Championships in Montichiari, Italy, he defended his Men's 4 km Individual Pursuit C5 title by defeating fellow Australian Alistair Donohoe.

In 2016, he was a Victorian Institute of Sport scholarship holder.

In 2016 he was found to have tested positive for the banned substance EPO and removed from the Australian Paralympic team for Rio 2016 Paralympics.

Recognition

Gallagher was named the Victorian Athlete of the Year with a Disability in 2006 and 2007. He was one of the top three finalists for the Australian Sportsperson of the Year with a Disability award in 2006 and the Victorian Institute of Sport Award of Excellence in 2007.  He also received the Victorian Institute of Sport Coaches Award for Cycling in 2006. In 2006, 2007, 2009 and 2010, he was named the  Cycling Australia Male Para-cyclist of the Year. In 2008, he was one of eighty Australians to participate in the 2008 Summer Olympics torch relay. In November 2013, he was named Cycling Australia's Elite Male Para-Cyclist of the Year.

References

External links
 
 
 
 

1978 births
Living people
Australian male cyclists
Paralympic cyclists of Australia
Paralympic gold medalists for Australia
Paralympic bronze medalists for Australia
Paralympic medalists in cycling
Cyclists at the 2008 Summer Paralympics
Cyclists at the 2012 Summer Paralympics
Cyclists at the 2016 Summer Paralympics
Medalists at the 2008 Summer Paralympics
Medalists at the 2012 Summer Paralympics
UCI Para-cycling World Champions
Recipients of the Medal of the Order of Australia
Scottish emigrants to Australia
Victorian Institute of Sport alumni
Doping cases in cycling
Doping cases in Australian cycling